Jacky Bowring (sometimes Jacqueline) is a New Zealand landscape architecture academic specialising in memories and memorials. She is currently a full professor at Lincoln University.

Academic career

After a BSc (Hons) at the University of Canterbury, Bowring completed a diploma and then a PhD in landscape architecture at Lincoln University. Joining the staff, Bowring rose to full professor.

Bowring's 2015 book A Field Guide to Melancholy was reviewed in The Guardian.

In 2017, Bowring was one of five winners in an LA+Journal competition to design an island, for which she took inspiration from Howland Island.

Bowring has been a part of the public discussion about the rebuilding of Christchurch after the 2011 Christchurch earthquake.

Selected works 
 Egoz, Shelley, Jacky Bowring, and Harvey C. Perkins. "Tastes in tension: form, function, and meaning in New Zealand’s farmed landscapes." Landscape and Urban Planning 57, no. 3-4 (2001): 177–196.
 Bowring, Jacky. A Field Guide to Melancholy. Oldcastle Books, 2015.
 Egoz, Shelley, Jacky Bowring, and Harvey C. Perkins. "Making a 'mess' in the countryside: Organic farming and the threats to sense of place." Landscape Journal 25, no. 1 (2006): 54–66.
 Vallance, Suzanne, Harvey C. Perkins, Jacky Bowring, and Jennifer E. Dixon. "Almost invisible: Glimpsing the city and its residents in the urban sustainability discourse." Urban Studies 49, no. 8 (2012): 1695–1710.
 Egoz, Shelley, and Jacky Bowring. "Beyond the romantic and naive: the search for a complex ecological aesthetic design language for landscape architecture in New Zealand." Landscape research 29, no. 1 (2004): 57–73.

References

External links
 

Living people
Year of birth missing (living people)
New Zealand women academics
New Zealand landscape architects
Lincoln University (New Zealand) alumni
Academic staff of the Lincoln University (New Zealand)
New Zealand women writers